Sir Leonard David Gammans, 1st Baronet (10 November 1895 – 8 February 1957), known as David Gammans, was a British Conservative Party politician.

Gammans was educated at Portsmouth Grammar School. He served with the Royal Field Artillery 1914–1918. He was in the Colonial Service in Malaya, 1920-1934 and attached to the British Embassy in Tokyo, 1926–1928. In 1930 he toured in India, Europe and America and, on retiring from the Colonial Service, lectured in the US and Canada. he was Director and Secretary of the Land Settlement Association, 1934–1939.

He was first elected to Parliament at a by-election in 1941, following the death of the Conservative Member of Parliament (MP) for Hornsey, Euan Wallace. Gammans held the North London seat until his own death in 1957, aged 61.  The resulting 1957 Hornsey by-election was won for the Conservatives by his wife Muriel, known as Lady Gammans.

In Winston Churchill's 1951–55 government, he served as Assistant Postmaster-General, under Earl De La Warr.

In 1952 there was "public outrage" that the Post Office cats had not had a pay rise since 1873, and the next year there was a question in the House of Commons, and Gammans was asked, "when the allowance payable for the maintenance of cats in his department was last raised?"

Gammans replied, "There is, I am afraid, a certain amount of industrial chaos in The Post Office cat world. Allowances vary in different places, possibly according to the alleged efficiency of the animals and other factors. It has proved impossible to organise any scheme for payment by results or output bonus ... there has been a general wage freeze since July 1918, but there have been no complaints!"

Gammans was made a baronet, of Hornsey in the County of Middlesex on 24 January 1956. The baronetcy became extinct on his death.

References

External links 

1895 births
1957 deaths
Baronets in the Baronetage of the United Kingdom
Conservative Party (UK) MPs for English constituencies
Ministers in the Eden government, 1955–1957
Ministers in the third Churchill government, 1951–1955
People educated at The Portsmouth Grammar School
UK MPs 1935–1945
UK MPs 1945–1950
UK MPs 1950–1951
UK MPs 1951–1955
UK MPs 1955–1959